St Barth Commuter is a French airline based in Saint-Barthélemy in the Caribbean.

History 

The airline was founded in 1995 and began services to Saint Maarten with a single Britten-Norman BN2A Islander. In 2005, the fleet was increased and new routes added  to San Juan in Puerto Rico and to the French side of Saint Martin, Marigot. The airline is wholly owned by Bruno Magras.

Destinations 

St Barth Commuter flies to the following destinations:

The airline has also regularly scheduled flights to other islands in the Caribbean.

St Barth Commuter also does charter flights to other islands in the region.

Fleet 

The St Barth Commuter fleet consisted of the following aircraft in January 2018:

Retired fleet

References

External links

Official web site

Airlines established in 1995
Airlines of Saint Barthélemy
Airlines of France
1995 establishments in Saint Barthélemy